Cheetah was a nightclub located at 1686 Broadway near 53rd Street in Manhattan, New York City. The club opened on May 28, 1966, and closed in the 1970's. The financial backing was provided by Borden Stevenson, son of politician Adlai Stevenson, and Olivier Coquelin. Robert Hilsky and Russell Hilsky were associated with the club.

According to Steven Watson's Factory Made: Warhol and the Sixties, it "was the granddaddy of the big commercial disco".

The musical Hair was performed at Cheetah before becoming a major production on Broadway.  A live album by The Esquires, Mike St Shaw and the Prophets, and The Thunder Frog Ensemble was recorded there in 1966 and released by Audio Fidelity Records as Where It's At — Cheetah (1966, AFSD 6168).

In 1968, the Cheetah reopened at 310 W 52nd near 8th Ave (formerly the Palm Gardens). Cheetah became a popular Latin-American dance club that helped popularize Salsa to mainstream America and is widely cited as the birthplace of salsa music, or at least of the popular use of the term "salsa" to denote pan-Latin music brewing in New York City. On Thursday, August 26, 1971, the Fania All-Stars headlined the club and drew an overflowing and excited crowd that was later captured on film as Our Latin Thing.  The Fania All-Stars brought together the leading lights in Latin music styles (descarga, mambo, boogaloo, merengue, folkloric) and presented a single concert drawing from these diverse influences. Although the term "salsa" had been used in Latin music dating back to at least Pupi Legarreta's 1962 LP Salsa Nova, this modern combination of styles being presented at the Cheetah Club began to become popularly known under the umbrella term "salsa".

References

1966 establishments in New York City
1970s disestablishments in New York (state)
Broadway (Manhattan)
Midtown Manhattan
Nightclubs in Manhattan
Salsa music